Warburn is a small rural community in the central north part of the Riverina.  It is situated by road, about 10 kilometres south east of Tabbita and 12 kilometres north west of Griffith.

Notes and references

Towns in the Riverina
Towns in New South Wales
Sturt County
City of Griffith